The 2020–21 ISU Junior Grand Prix was scheduled to be the 24th season of a series of junior international competitions organized by the International Skating Union. It was intended to be the junior-level complement to the 2020–21 ISU Grand Prix of Figure Skating. Skaters would have competed for medals in the disciplines of men's singles, ladies' singles, pair skating, and ice dance, as well as for qualifying points. The top six from each discipline would have qualified for the 2020–21 Junior Grand Prix Final, to be held together with the senior final.

On July 20, 2020, the ISU officially cancelled the JGP series.

Reactions to the COVID-19 pandemic 
On May 1, 2020, the International Skating Union established a working group, chaired by ISU Vice-president for Figure Skating Alexander Lakernik, to monitor the ongoing COVID-19 pandemic. Its responsibilities include determining the feasibility of holding events as scheduled, possibly behind closed doors, during the first half of the 2020–21 season and the financial impact of any potential cancellations. The ISU announced that a host federation must make a decision regarding potential cancellation of their event at latest 10 weeks prior to the event.

On May 16, 2020, the Slovak Figure Skating Association informed the ISU that it had cancelled all upcoming events that it was scheduled to host due to the ongoing pandemic, including the second event of the JGP series in Košice. On May 26, Skate Canada cancelled the first event of the JGP series that it was originally scheduled to host in Richmond, British Columbia. On July 3, the Japan Skating Federation cancelled its event in Shin-Yokohama, originally scheduled as the fourth in the series. On July 13, a pairs event was added to JGP Hungary.

The Japan Skating Federation announced on July 13 that it would not assign any skaters to the Junior Grand Prix, assuming the competitions proceeded as scheduled.

On July 13, the ISU announced major changes to the JGP format, including:
 No ISU Junior Grand Prix points will be awarded and no ISU Junior Grand Prix Ranking for 2020/21 will be established.
 There will be no pre-allocated entries for ISU Members to participate in each Junior Grand Prix event and ISU Members may choose in which events they will enter their skaters.

On July 20, the ISU officially cancelled the remaining events of the series, citing increased travel and entry requirements between countries and potentially excessive sanitary & health care costs for hosting members.

Competitions 
The locations of the JGP events change yearly. In the 2020–21 season, the series was originally scheduled to be composed of the following events in autumn 2020:

On May 16, 2020, the ISU announced that the Slovak Figure Skating Association had cancelled the second stop of the series, scheduled for September 2–5 in Košice, Slovakia. Skate Canada announced that they would do the same, regarding the first stop of the series, on May 26. On July 3, the Japan Skating Federation cancelled its event, originally scheduled as the fourth in the series.

On June 15, it was announced that a sixth event had been added after the previously announced events, to be hosted in Riga, Latvia.

The entire series was cancelled on July 20.

Entries 
Skaters who reach the age of 13 before July 1, 2020, but have not turned 19 (singles and females of the other two disciplines) or 21 (male pair skaters and ice dancers) are eligible to compete on the junior circuit. Competitors are chosen by their countries according to their federation's selection procedures. The number of entries allotted to each ISU member federation is determined by their skaters' placements at the 2020 World Junior Championships in each discipline.

Number of entries per discipline 
Based on the results of the 2020 World Junior Championships, each ISU member nation was allowed to field the following number of entries per event. However, prior to the series' cancellation on July 20, the ISU Working Group decided that due to the ongoing COVID-19 pandemic, there would be no pre-allocated entries for each JGP event and ISU members could choose which events to send skaters to.

Singles and ice dance

Pairs

References

External links
 ISU Junior Grand Prix at the International Skating Union

ISU Junior Grand Prix
Junior Grand Prix
Isujunior
Isujunior